Agrotis is a genus of moths of the family Noctuidae. The genus was erected by Ferdinand Ochsenheimer in 1816. A number of the species of this genus are extinct.

Description
The proboscis is well developed. Palpi obliquely porrect (extending forward), where the second joint evenly scaled and third joint prominent. Thorax and abdomen without tufts. Abdomen somewhat flattened. Tibia very strongly spined. Forewings with non-crenulate outer margin. Hindwings with veins 3 and 4 from cell.

Ecology
Many of the species are of great importance as cutworms, major agricultural pests whose larvae hide by day and emerge at night to feed. The name cutworm refers to the habit of the larvae, of cutting down and partly eating garden and crop plants, especially seedlings. Not all cutworms are in the genus Agrotis, though it may well be the genus that includes the largest number of cutworm species, and the most agriculturally important cutworm species.

The bogong moth, itself a cutworm, also has been of importance as a seasonal food for humans, valued by indigenous Australians.

Species

 Agrotis admirationis Guenée, 1868
 Agrotis alexandriensis Baker, 1894
 Agrotis alpestris Boisduval, 1837
 Agrotis alticaffer Krüger, 2005
 Agrotis altivagans (Varga, 1979)
 Agrotis antica Crabo & Lafontaine, 2004
 Agrotis apicalis Herrich-Schäffer, 1868
 Agrotis amphora Hampson, 1903
 Agrotis andina (Köhler, 1945)
 Agrotis araucaria (Hampson, 1903)
 Agrotis arenarius Neil, 1983
 Agrotis arenivolans Butler, 1879
 Agrotis atrux Pinker, 1971
 Agrotis aulacias Meyrick, 1899
 Agrotis baliopa Meyrick, 1899
 Agrotis bilitura Guenée, 1852
 Agrotis bigramma (Esper, 1790)
 Agrotis boetica (Boisduval, 1837)
 Agrotis bosqui (Köhler, 1945)
 Agrotis brachystria (Hampson 1903)
 Agrotis brachypecten Hampson, 1899
 Agrotis bryani Swezey, 1926
 Agrotis buchholzi Barnes & Benjamin, 1929 (syn: Agrotis carolina Schweitzer & McCabe, 2004)
 Agrotis caffer (Hampson, 1903)
 Agrotis canities (Grote, 1902)
 Agrotis ceramophaea Meyrick, 1899
 Agrotis characteristica Alphéraky, 1892
 Agrotis charmocrita (Meyrick, 1928)
 Agrotis chretieni Dumont, 1903
 Agrotis cinerea Denis & Schiffermüller, 1775 – light feathered rustic moth
 Agrotis clavis Hufnagel, 1766 – heart-and-club moth
 Agrotis consentanea Mabille, 1880
 Agrotis coquimbensis (Hampson, 1903)
 Agrotis crassa Hübner, 1803
 †Agrotis cremata Butler, 1880 – Maui agrotis noctuid moth
 †Agrotis crinigera Butler, 1881 – poko noctuid moth, larger Hawaiian cutworm moth
 Agrotis cursoriodes (Hampson, 1903)
 Agrotis daedalus Smith, 1890
 Agrotis desertorum Boisduval, 1840
 Agrotis dislocata Walker, 1856
 Agrotis dissociata Staudinger, 1899
 Agrotis edmondsi Butler, 1882
 Agrotis emboloma Lower, 1918
 Agrotis endogaea Boisduval, 1837
 Agrotis epicremna Meyrick, 1899
 Agrotis eremata (Butler, 1880)
 Agrotis evanescens Rothschild 1894
 Agrotis exclamationis Linnaeus, 1758 – heart-and-dart moth
 Agrotis experta (Walker, 1869)
 †Agrotis fasciata Hübner, 1824 – Midway noctuid moth
 Agrotis fatidica Hübner, 1824
 Agrotis fortunata Draudt, 1938
 Agrotis frosya Pekarsky, 2014 TL: Bering Island
 Agrotis giffardi (Swezey, 1932)
 Agrotis gladiaria Morrison, 1875 – swordsman dart moth, clay-backed cutworm moth
 Agrotis graslini Rambur, 1848
 Agrotis gravis Grote, 1874
 Agrotis gypaetina Guenée, 1852
 Agrotis haesitans Walker, 1857
 Agrotis haifae Staudinger, 1897
 Agrotis hephaestaea (Meyrick, 1899)
 Agrotis herzogi Rebel, 1911
 Agrotis hispidula Guenée, 1852
 Agrotis incognita Staudinger, 1888
 Agrotis inconsequens Rothschild, 1920
 Agrotis infusa Boisduval, 1832 – bogong
 Agrotis innominata Hudson, 1898
 Agrotis interjectionis Guénée, 1852
 Agrotis ipsilon Hufnagel, 1766 – ipsilon dart moth, dark sword-grass moth
 Agrotis iremeli Nupponen, Ahola & Kullberg, 2001
 †Agrotis kerri Swezey, 1920 – Kerr's noctuid moth
 Agrotis kinabaluensis Holloway, 1976
 Agrotis kingi McDunnough, 1932
 Agrotis lanzarotensis Rebel, 1894 (syn: Agrotis selvagensis Pinker & Bacallado, 1978)
 Agrotis lasserrei (Oberthür, 1881)
 Agrotis lata Treitschke, 1835
 †Agrotis laysanensis Rothschild, 1894 – Laysan noctuid moth
 Agrotis longicornis Lafontaine & Troubridge, 2004
 Agrotis longidentifera (Hampson, 1903)
 Agrotis luehri Mentzer & Moberg, 1987
 Agrotis magnipunctata Prout, 1922
 Agrotis malefida Guénée, 1852 – rascal dart moth, pale-sided cutworm moth
 Agrotis manifesta Morrison, 1875
 Agrotis margelanoides (Boursin, 1944)
 †Agrotis melanoneura Meyrick, 1899 – black-veined agrotis noctuid moth
 Agrotis mayrorum Ronkay & Huemer, 2018
 Agrotis mazeli Ronkay & Huemer, 2018
 Agrotis mesotoxa Meyrick, 1899
 †Agrotis microreas Meyrick, 1899 – microreas agrotis noctuid moth
 Agrotis militaris Staudinger, 1888 (syn: Rhyacia furushonis Matsumura, 1925)
 Agrotis mollis Walker, 1857
 Agrotis munda Walker, 1857 – brown cutworm moth, pink cutworm moth
 Agrotis obesa Boisduval, 1829
 Agrotis obliqua Smith, 1903
 Agrotis orthogonia Morrison, 1876 – pale western cutworm moth
 †Agrotis panoplias Meyrick, 1899 – Kona agrotis noctuid moth
 Agrotis patricei Viette, 1959
 Agrotis perigramma Meyrick, 1899
 †Agrotis photophila Butler, 1879 – light-loving noctuid moth
 Agrotis pierreti (Bugnion, 1837)
 Agrotis plumiger Krüger, 2005
 Agrotis poliophaea Turner, 1926
 Agrotis poliotis Hampson, 1903
 Agrotis porphyricollis Guénée, 1852 – variable cutworm moth
 †Agrotis procellaris Meyrick, 1900 – procellaris grotis noctuid moth
 Agrotis psammocharis Boursin, 1950
 Agrotis psammophaea Meyrick, 1899
 Agrotis puta Hübner, 1803 – shuttle-shaped dart moth
 Agrotis radians Guénée, 1852
 Agrotis rileyana (Morrison, 1875)
 Agrotis ripae Hübner, 1823 – sand dart moth
 Agrotis robustior Smith, 1899
 Agrotis ruta Eversmann, 1851
 Agrotis sabulosa Rambur, 1839
 Agrotis sardzeana Brandt, 1941
 Agrotis schawerdai Bytinski-Salz, 1937
 Agrotis scruposa (Draudt, 1936)
 Agrotis segetum Denis & Schiffermüller, 1775 – turnip moth
 Agrotis sesamioides Rebel, 1907
 Agrotis simplonia Geyer, 1832
 Agrotis spinifera Hübner, 1808 – Gregson's dart moth
 Agrotis stenibergmani (Bryk, 1941) (syn: Rhyacia stenibergmani poverina Bryk, 1942)
 Agrotis stigmosa Morrison, 1875
 Agrotis striata Lafontaine, 2004
 Agrotis subalba Walker, 1857
 Agrotis submolesta Püngeler, [1899] 1900
 Agrotis syricola Corti & Draudt, 1933
 Agrotis taiwana B.S.Chang, 1991
 Agrotis talda (Schaus & Clements, 1893)
 †Agrotis tephrias Meyrick, 1899 – Kauai agrotis noctuid moth
 Agrotis trifurca Eversmann, 1837
 Agrotis trifurcula Staudinger, 1892
 Agrotis trux Hübner, 1824
 Agrotis turatii Standfuss, 1888
 Agrotis turbans Staudinger, 1888
 Agrotis vancouverensis Grote, 1873 – Vancouver dart moth
 Agrotis venerabilis Walker, 1857 – venerable dart moth, dusky cutworm moth
 Agrotis vestigialis Hufnagel, 1766 – archer's dart
 Agrotis vetusta Walker, 1865 – old man dart moth, spotted-legged cutworm moth, muted dart moth
 Agrotis villosus Alphéraky, 1887
 Agrotis volubilis Harvey, 1874 – voluble dart moth
 Agrotis xiphias Meyrick, 1899
 Agrotis yelai Fibiger, 1990

Until recently placed here
 Agrotis dolli is now Eucoptocnemis dolli (Grote, 1882)
 Agrotis repleta is now Feltia repleta (Walker, 1857)
 Agrotis subterranea – tawny shoulder, granulate cutworm is now Feltia subterranea (Fabricius, 1794)

References

 Pekarsky, O. (2014). "Contribution to the knowledge of Noctuidae fauna of Bering island." Fibigeriana supplement: 2. 177–200 pp. color plates 299–304 pp.
 Varga, Z. (1979). "Neue Noctuiden aus der Sammlung Vartian (Wien), II. (Lepidoptera, Noctuidae). Zeitschrift der Arbeitsgemeinschaft Österreichischer Entomologen 31: 1-12.

External links

Agrotis - Encyclopaedia of Life
Extinct animals
Hawaii extinct species

 
Noctuinae
Noctuoidea genera